Drakonera (Greek: Δρακονέρα) is an island of the Echinades, among the Ionian Islands group of Greece.  Drakonera forms part of the northern group of the Echinades, which are called the Drakoneras after the island. The mainland with the Aetolia-Acarnania regional unit is to the north and east. Several islets surround the area.  It is administered by the municipality of Ithaca. , it had no resident population.

References

External links
Drakonera on GTP Travel Pages (in English and Greek)

Echinades
Islands of the Ionian Islands (region)
Landforms of Ithaca
Islands of Greece